"Mister Puerto Rico" is the common name or sash used to identify a Puerto Rican representative in an international male beauty pageant.  Several organizations have held annual male pageants in San Juan, Puerto Rico. Currently, Mister Puerto Rico Model and Mister Puerto Rico Teenager are the most important male beauty pageant event. Each year both events are held to select the representatives from the island.

Misters of Puerto Rico
Misters of Puerto Rico, is considered the largest, most important and prestigious event of fashion and male beauty in Puerto Rico. Throughout its history, this event has consolidated as a solid local and international prestige. The aim of Mister Puerto Rico is to present a series of exhibitions and developmental workshops for the Puerto Rican male. The Misters of Puerto Rico organization aims to develop personal and professional growth of the modern man. In 2016, the two largest male pageant organizations in Puerto Rico were merged when Mister Puerto Rico International, led by Miguel Deliz, was incorporated into Mister International Puerto Rico, led by Rubén Díaz.

While there are multiple local pageant agencies, Nuestra Belleza Puerto Rico, (Our Beauty Puerto Rico), is the one in charge of sending representatives to the international competitions.

Competition
Misters of Puerto Rico candidates, live an enriching and learning experience, focusing on charitable causes and events of great significance in Puerto Rico. All activities promote the growth of the candidate to the "Final Competition":

 Workshops: Seminars about modeling and runway, projection and personal improvement. They are also training in personal care, physical assessment and fashion. The delegates attend workshops to refine how they pronounce words to improve their diction and learn to speak properly. Every year the misters receive preparedness workshops before the interview with the judges.
 Model's Week: During a weekend, the 78 candidates are involved in different activities of fraternization. They participate in photo shoots, interviews and charitable activities.
 Talent Competition: A spectacular evening filled with music, dance and art demonstrations. The winner gets a pass as a finalist to secure the final competition.
 Personal Interview: Each candidate presents his personality and interests before the panel of judges who evaluate each individual. Professional experts in different areas and personalities from the fashion and entertainment, are the ones who are responsible for the choice of each and every one of the prizes.
 Preliminary Competition / Final Competition: The candidates parade in Swimwear, Clothing and Apparel Formal Fashion in the show which leads to the choice of winners.

Titleholders

Organized by Misters of Puerto Rico, Inc.

Mister Puerto Rico Model

Mister Puerto Rico Teenager

Mister Latin Model Puerto Rico

Mister Teen Model Puerto Rico

Mister International Puerto Rico

Mister Puerto Rico International

Mister Supranational Puerto Rico

Manhunt Puerto Rico

Mister Global Puerto Rico

Mister World Puerto Rico

Best Model of the World

References

External links

Misters of Puerto Rico at Myspace
Mister Puerto Rico Official website
Trayectoria - Candidatos

Puerto Rican awards
Puerto Rico
Beauty pageants in Puerto Rico